Cotton Hill Township is a township in Dunklin County, in the U.S. state of Missouri.

Cotton Hill Township was established in 1845, and named for a trading center within its borders.

References

Townships in Missouri
Townships in Dunklin County, Missouri